Njihovi dani (Serbian Cyrillic: Њихови дани, trans. Their Days) is the first and so far the only studio album released by Bora Đorđević. Although the album was recorded by the members of Đorđević's band Riblja Čorba, Đorđević decided to release the album in his own name, as the album criticizes the regime of the former president of FR Yugoslavia Slobodan Milošević and his wife Mirjana Marković. The album was released in Republika Srpska through SIM Radio Bijeljina, in order to avoid political censorship.

The A side of the album was entitled Njegovi dani (His Days, referring to Slobodan Milošević) and the B side was entitled Njeni dani (Her Days, referring to Mirjana Marković). The album cover, designed by Jugoslav Vlahović and Boban Ristić, features the silhouettes of Milošević and Marković.

Track listing
All the songs were written by Đorđević, except where noted.
"Diktator" – 3:01
"Seljačine" (V. Milatović, B. Đorđević) – 2:47
"Beograde, Beograde" (D. Jakšić, B. Đorđević) – 3:10
"Mesara Papak Bluz" – 4:40
"Baba Jula" – 3:03
"Zabela" (V. Milatović, B. Đorđević) – 3:19
"Ko će koga" – 3:26
"Decu ti neću oprostiti" – 4:01

Personnel
Bora Đorđević - vocals, producer
Vidoja Božinović - guitar
Miša Aleksić - bass guitar, producer
Vlada Barjaktarević - keyboards, producer, recorded by
Vicko Milatović - drums, backing vocals
Marija Mihajlović - backing vocals
Milan Popović - backing vocals, producer
Minđušari members - backing vocals
Dušan Suvajac - accordion
Branko Marković - double bass (on track 8)
Veselin Maldaner - recorded by

References
 EX YU ROCK enciklopedija 1960-2006,  Janjatović Petar;

External links
Njihovi dani at Discogs

Bora Đorđević albums
1996 albums